The Arrow Sport was a two-seat sporting biplane aircraft built in the United States in the 1920s and 1930s.

Design and construction
The plane was designed by Swen Swanson and it was of largely conventional configuration with tailskid undercarriage, but was interesting in that the pilot and passenger sat side by side in the open cockpit, and because as originally designed, the fully cantilever wings lacked interplane struts – the upper wing attaching directly to the top of the fuselage. This latter feature proved so alarming to many prospective pilots that the manufacturer later supplied N-type struts that were of no real function other than to allay the aviators' fears.

Survivors

Nine biplane Sports remain registered in the United States as of 2020, mostly in museums and private collections, including:
 a Sport Pursuit (N8181, serial 432) preserved in the terminal building of the Lincoln Airport in Nebraska, Arrow's city of manufacture, and owned by the Nebraska State Historical Society.
 a Sport (N530A, serial 304) preserved at the Dakota Territory Air Museum in North Dakota.
 a Sport A2-60 (ex-N9325/G-AARO, serial 341) preserved at the National Air and Space Museum in Washington, D.C.
 a Sport Pursuit (N853H, serial 412) is on display at the Western Antique Aeroplane & Automobile Museum in Oregon.

Variants
 Sport – Two-seat sporting biplane, powered by a 60-hp (45-kW) LeBlond radial piston engine.
 Sport 85 – 85 hp Leblond radial, extra four degrees of dihedral on lower wing.
 Sport A2
 Sport A2-40
 Sport A2-60  LeBlond radial engines
 Sport A2-66
 Sport A2-90 Tangerine
 Sport A2-100  Kinner C-5
 Sport Pursuit (renamed Sport K in 1935) – Improved version, powered by a 100-hp (75-kW) Kinner K-5 radial engine.
 Sport V-8 (renamed the Model F) – Two-seat monoplane version, powered by a converted  Ford V8 automobile engine.
 Sport M – Model F with a  Menasco C-4 Pirate engine.

Specifications (A2-60)

See also

References
Notes

Bibliography

External links

 Arrow Sport A2-60 – National Air and Space Museum
 Arrow Sport – Aviation History Online Museum

1920s United States sport aircraft
Sport
Single-engined tractor aircraft
Biplanes
Aircraft first flown in 1926